The Peterborough Petes are a junior ice hockey team in the Ontario Hockey League. The team has played at the Peterborough Memorial Centre in Peterborough, Ontario, Canada, since 1956, and is the oldest continuously operating team in the league.

History
The Petes were born on October 1, 1956 when the Kitchener Canucks relocated to Peterborough after the 1955–56 season. They would also become a sponsored junior team for the Montreal Canadiens of the NHL. The Petes played their first game on November 4, 1956, and won their first game on November 8, 1956.

The Petes have produced a record number of National Hockey League players, including Hall of Famers Steve Yzerman, Bob Gainey, Larry Murphy, Scotty Bowman, Wayne Gretzky and Roger Neilson. The Petes have graduated the most players to the NHL of all current OHL teams with a total of 248.

The Petes have won the OHL Championship nine times, second-most in OHL history and the most in the postwar period. They won the Memorial Cup once, in 1979.

TPT Petes
The team was sponsored by Toronto-Peterborough Transport (TPT) from 1956 to 1966. Scotty Bowman was brought in to coach by the Montreal Canadiens organization from the Ottawa-Hull Canadiens junior team, and led the team to a second-place finish in 1959. Peterborough defeated the Barrie Flyers, Guelph Biltmore Mad Hatters and Toronto St. Michael's Majors in the playoffs to win their first OHA championship. Bowman and the TPT Petes went on to reach the Memorial Cup for the first time that year but fell to the Winnipeg Braves. The TPT Petes claimed their first Hamilton Spectator Trophy during the 1965-66 season, but were eliminated from the playoffs.

Roger Neilson era (1966–1976)
The team became known as the Peterborough Petes Hockey Club in 1966–67, which was also the beginning of Roger Neilson's tenure as coach. The Petes would continue to wear the TPT logo on their sweaters until 1974–75, when their colours were changed to maroon and white and a new "Petes" logo was adopted.

Neilson led his team to seven consecutive winning seasons from 1968 to 1975, also finishing first overall in 1970–71, winning the J. Ross Robertson Cup in 1972, and were runners-up in 1973 and 1974. In the 1972 Memorial Cup, the Petes lost a close 2–1 game in the finals to the Cornwall Royals.

Neilson left behind a winning legacy in Peterborough and set the standard for coaches to come. Neilson was the first coach to use videotape analysis as a teaching method, leading to the nickname "Captain Video," and also the first to use microphone headsets to communicate with his assistant coaches.

Neilson also pushed the envelope causing several rules to be rewritten. During one Petes game, his team was up one goal, but was down two men in a five on three situation for the last minute of the game. Realizing that more penalties could not be called under the existing rules, Neilson put too many men on the ice every ten seconds. The referees stopped the play and a faceoff was held relieving pressure on the defence. After this display the rule was changed so that a call for too many men on the ice in a 5 on 3 situation now leads to a penalty shot.

Neilson also discovered that if he put a defenceman in net instead of a goalie during a penalty shot, the defenceman could rush the attacker and greatly reduce the chances of a goal.  Today the rule states that a team must use a goalie in net for a penalty shot, and that the goalie may not leave the crease until the attacking player touches the puck.

Neilson was promoted for the 1976–77 season, coaching the Dallas Black Hawks in the former Central Hockey League.

Three seasons, three titles
The Peterborough Petes won three consecutive OHL championships in 1978, 1979 and 1980. Gary Green coached the first two championships followed up by Mike Keenan in 1980. The Petes won the Hamilton Spectator Trophy two consecutive times in 1979 and 1980. Peterborough's success also continued into the Memorial Cup, reaching the championship game all three years, and winning the national junior title in 1979.

Many future NHL stars played for Petes in these three years. Those of note are: Keith Acton, Bob Atwell, Keith Crowder, Ken Ellacott, Doug Evans, Dave Fenyves, Tom Fergus, Larry Floyd, Mark Kirton,
Rick LaFerriere, Steve Larmer, Larry Murphy, Mark Reeds, Stuart Smith, Steve Smith, Bill Gardner, Tim Trimper and Jim Wiemer.

Dick Todd era (1982–1993)
Dick Todd started with the Petes as a trainer in the 1970s and was with the team through their three Memorial Cups. As a coach he led the team to two more Memorial Cup tournaments—in 1989 in Saskatoon, and in 1993 in Sault Ste. Marie. During Todd's time as coach, the Petes won six division titles and had the best overall winning percentage in the OHL. Todd was awarded the Matt Leyden Trophy as OHL Coach of the Year in 1987–88.

Memorial Cup 1996
The Peterborough Petes celebrated their 40th anniversary in 1996. The Petes won the J. Ross Robertson Cup defeating the Guelph Storm in the finals, then and also played at home while hosting the Memorial Cup tournament in 1996. The club achieved a 100% sellout each tournament game, and lost in the final that year to the Granby Prédateurs.

50th anniversary

Todd returned as head coach of the Petes in 2004. Todd's second season back behind the Petes bench, was the 50th anniversary of the Peterborough Petes founding. They are the oldest continuously operating franchise in the Ontario Hockey League (the rival Oshawa Generals date to 1937 but were inactive from 1953–62).

The Petes celebrated their 50th anniversary in grand style, winning the J. Ross Robertson Cup on May 11, 2006, in a four-game sweep of the London Knights. Peterborough travelled to Moncton, New Brunswick to play in the 2006 Memorial Cup, losing the third place tiebreaker game to the Vancouver Giants. Todd retired for good a few weeks after the Petes returned from Moncton.

60th anniversary
The 2015–16 season marked the 60th in franchise history.

Championships

Memorial Cup
1959 Finalist vs. Winnipeg Braves
1972 Finalist vs. Cornwall Royals
1978 Finalist vs. New Westminster Bruins
1979 Champions vs. Brandon Wheat Kings
1980 Finalist vs. Cornwall Royals
1989 3rd place in Saskatoon, SK
1993 Finalist vs. S.S. Marie Greyhounds
1996 Finalist vs. Granby Prédateurs
2006 4th Place in Moncton, NB

George Richardson Memorial Trophy
1959 Champions vs. Ottawa-Hull Canadiens

Hamilton Spectator Trophy First overall in the OHL regular season standings.
1965–1966 58 points
1970–1971 90 points
1978–1979 95 points
1979–1980 95 points
1985–1986 92 points
1991–1992 89 points
1992–1993 97 points

J. Ross Robertson Cup
1959 Champions vs. St. Michael's Majors
1972 Champions vs. Ottawa 67's
1973 Finalist vs. Toronto Marlboros
1974 Finalist vs. St. Catharines Black Hawks
1978 Champions vs. Hamilton Fincups
1979 Champions vs. Niagara Falls Flyers
1980 Champions vs. Windsor Spitfires
1985 Finalist vs. S.S. Marie Greyhounds
1988 Finalist vs. Windsor Compuware Spitfires
1989 Champions vs. Niagara Falls Thunder
1993 Champions vs. S.S. Marie Greyhounds
1996 Champions vs. Guelph Storm
2006 Champions vs. London Knights

Leyden Trophy First overall in the Eastern Division regular season standings.
1978–79, 1979–80, 1984–85, 1985–86, 1987–88, 1988–89, 1991–92, 1992–93, 2004–05, 2005–06, 2016–17

Coaches
Three coaches of the Peterborough Petes are members of the Hockey Hall of Fame. Scotty Bowman won 9 Stanley Cups in his career, and lead the Petes to the Memorial Cup finals in 1959. Roger Neilson coached 1,000 regular season games in the NHL, and led the Petes to the 1972 Memorial Cup finals. Ted "Teeder" Kennedy played 14 years for the Toronto Maple Leafs.

Gary Green was awarded the Matt Leyden Trophy as OHL Coach of the Year in 1978–79, leading the Petes to their only Memorial Cup championship.

Dick Todd recorded 500 career victories faster than any other coach in Major Junior A hockey history, accomplishing the milestone in just 813 games. Todd was awarded the Matt Leyden Trophy as OHL Coach of the Year in 1987–88.

List of coaches with multiple seasons in parentheses.
1956–57 — Calum MacKay
1957–58 — Ted Kennedy
1958–61 — Scotty Bowman (3)
1961–62 — Neil Burke
1962–65 — Frank Mario (3)
1965–66 — Roger Bedard (2)
1966–67 — R. Bedard & R. Neilson
1967–76 — Roger Neilson (10)
1976–77 — Garry Young
1977–79 — Gary Green (2)
1979–80 — Mike Keenan
1980–81 — Dave Dryden (2)
1981–82 — D. Dryden & D. Todd
1982–93 — Dick Todd (14)
1993–96 — Dave MacQueen (3)
1996–97 — Brian Drumm (2)
1997–98 — B. Drumm & Jeff Twohey
1998–04 — Rick Allain (6)
2004–05 — Dick Todd (14) 
2005–08 — Vince Malette (2)
2008–10 — Ken McRae
2010–12 — Mike Pelino (2+)
2012–18 — Jody Hull (4+)
2018 — Andrew Verner (interim)
2018–present — Rob Wilson

Players
The Peterborough Petes have 152 alumni who have played in the National Hockey League. Seven Hockey Hall of Fame inductees played junior hockey for the Petes: Bob Gainey, Larry Murphy, Steve Yzerman and Chris Pronger and coaches Scotty Bowman and Roger Nielson.

The Petes have not retired any numbers, but they have banners hanging from the ceiling honouring past Petes including Bob Gainey, Steve Yzerman, Mickey Redmond, Larry Murphy, Dick Todd, Roger Neilson, Scotty Bowman and Colin Campbell.

Award winners

CHL Player of the Year
1989–90 – Mike Ricci

CHL Defenceman of the Year
1992–93 – Chris Pronger

CHL Top Draft Prospect Award
2005–06 – Jordan Staal

CHL Rookie of the Year
2009–10 – Matt Puempel

CHL Sportsman of the Year
2019-20 – Nicholas Robertson

George Parsons Trophy Most Sportsmanlike at the Memorial Cup
1978 – Mark Kirton
1979 – Chris Halyk
1993 – Jason Dawe
1994 – Jeff Smith
1996 – Mike Williams

Hap Emms Memorial Trophy Outstanding Goaltender at the Memorial Cup
1978 – Ken Ellacott
1980 – Rick LaFerriere

Stafford Smythe Memorial Trophy Memorial Cup MVP
1996 – Cameron Mann

Red Tilson Trophy Most Outstanding Player
1959–60 – Wayne Connelly
1964–65 – Andre Lacroix
1965–66 – Andre Lacroix
1966–67 – Mickey Redmond
1989–90 – Mike Ricci

Eddie Powers Memorial Trophy Scoring Champion
1965–66 – Andre Lacroix

Jim Mahon Memorial Trophy Top scoring right winger
1995–96 – Cameron Mann

Max Kaminsky Trophy Most Outstanding Defenceman
1969–70 – Ron Plumb
1973–74 – Jim Turkiewicz
1978–79 – Greg Theberge
1979–80 – Larry Murphy
1985–86 – Terry Carkner
1992–93 – Chris Pronger

Wayne Gretzky 99 Award OHL Playoffs MVP
2005–06 – Daniel Ryder

Emms Family Award Rookie of the Year
1989–90 – Chris Longo
2009–10 – Matt Puempel

Leo Lalonde Memorial Trophy Overage Player of the Year
1996–97 – Zac Bierk

OHL Goaltender of the Year
1996–97 – Zac Bierk

Dave Pinkney Trophy Lowest Team GAA
1958–59 – Jacques Caron
1962–63 – Chuck Goddard
1969–70 – John Garrett
1970–71 – John Garrett
1974–75 – Greg Millen
1979–80 – Rick LaFerriere & Terry Wright
1985–86 – Kay Whitmore & Ron Tugnutt
1987–88 – John Tanner & Todd Bojcun
1988–89 – John Tanner & Todd Bojcun
1992–93 – Chad Lang & Ryan Douglas

F. W. "Dinty" Moore Trophy Best Rookie GAA
1977–78 – Ken Ellacott
1981–82 – Shawn Kilroy
1984–85 – Ron Tugnutt
1987–88 – Todd Bojcun

Dan Snyder Memorial Trophy Humanitarian of the Year
1993–94 – Brent Tully
1996–97 – Mike Martone
2004–05 – Jeff MacDougald
2010–11 – Jack Walchessen
2011–12 – Andrew D'Agostini

William Hanley Trophy Most Sportsmanlike Player
1965–66 – Andre Lacroix
1966–67 – Mickey Redmond
1974–75 – Doug Jarvis
1984–85 – Scott Tottle
1989–90 – Mike Ricci
2009–10 – Ryan Spooner
2019-20 – Nicholas Robertson

Bobby Smith Trophy Scholastic Player of the Year
1983–84 – Scott Tottle

Ivan Tennant Memorial Award Top Academic High School Player
2010–11 – Andrew D'Agostini

NHL alumni
Players in bold are members of the Hockey Hall of Fame.

Season-by-season results

Regular season
Legend: OL = Overtime loss, SL = Shootout loss

Playoffs
1956–57 Out of playoffs.
1957–58 Lost to Hamilton Tiger-Cubs 7 points to 3 in quarter-finals.
1958–59 Defeated Barrie Flyers 8 points to 4 in quarter-finals. Defeated Guelph Biltmore Mad Hatters 8 points to 2 in semi-finals. Defeated Toronto St. Michael's Majors 9 points to 7 in finals. OHA CHAMPIONS Defeated Ottawa-Hull Canadiens in Richardson Trophy playoffs. Lost to Winnipeg Braves in Memorial Cup finals.
1959–60 Defeated Barrie Flyers 8 points to 4 in quarter-finals. Lost to St. Catharines Teepees 9 points to 3 in semi-finals.
1960–61 Lost to Hamilton Red Wings 8 points to 2 in quarter-finals.
1961–62 Out of playoffs.
1962–63 Lost to Montreal Junior Canadiens 9 points to 3 in quarter-finals.
1963–64 Lost to Montreal Junior Canadiens 8 points to 2 in quarter-finals.
1964–65 Defeated St. Catharines Black Hawks 8 points to 2 in quarter-finals. Lost to Toronto Marlboros 9 points to 7 in semi-finals.
1965–66 Lost to Toronto Marlboros 8 points to 4 in quarter-finals.
1966–67 Lost to Hamilton Red Wings 8 points to 4 in quarter-finals.
1967–68 Lost to Niagara Falls Flyers 8 points to 2 in quarter-finals.
1968–69 Defeated London Knights 8 points to 4 in quarter-finals. Lost to Montreal Junior Canadiens 8 points to 0 in semi-finals.
1969–70 Lost to London Knights 8 points to 4 in quarter-finals.
1970–71 Lost to Toronto Marlboros 8 points to 0 in quarter-finals.
1971–72 Defeated St. Catharines Black Hawks 8 points to 2 in quarter-finals. Defeated Toronto Marlboros 8 points to 2 in semi-finals. Defeated Ottawa 67's 8 points to 0 in finals. OHA CHAMPIONS Lost in Memorial Cup final to Cornwall Royals.
1972–73 Defeated Oshawa Generals 8 points to 0 in quarter-finals. Defeated London Knights 9 points to 5 in semi-finals. Lost to Toronto Marlboros 8 points to 6 in finals.
1973–74 Defeated Ottawa 67's 9 points to 5 in quarter-finals. Defeated Kitchener Rangers 8 points to 4 in semi-finals. Lost to St. Catharines Black Hawks 9 points to 1 in finals.
1974–75 Defeated Oshawa Generals 8 points to 2 in quarter-finals. Lost to Hamilton Fincups 8 points to 4 in semi-finals.
1975–76 Out of playoffs.
1976–77 Lost to S.S. Marie Greyhounds 3 games to 1 in first round.
1977–78 Defeated Oshawa Generals 9 points to 3 in quarter-finals. Defeated Ottawa 67's 9 points to 7 in semi-finals. Defeated Hamilton Fincups 8 points to 6 in finals. OHL CHAMPIONS Finished Memorial Cup round-robin in first place, earned berth in finals. Lost to New Westminster Bruins 7-4 in the championship game.
1978–79 Defeated Kingston Canadians 9 points to 5 in quarter-finals. Defeated Sudbury Wolves 8 points to 2 in semi-finals. Defeated Niagara Falls Flyers 8 points to 6 in finals. OHL CHAMPIONS Finished Memorial Cup round-robin in a three way tie, advancing to the finals on goals for/against. Defeated Brandon Wheat Kings 2-1 in OT in the championship game. MEMORIAL CUP CHAMPIONS
1979–80 Defeated Sudbury Wolves 4 games to 3 in quarter-finals. Defeated Ottawa 67's 4 games to 0 in semi-finals. Defeated Windsor Spitfires 4 games to 0 in finals. OHL CHAMPIONS Finished Memorial Cup round-robin in first place, earned berth in finals. Lost to Cornwall Royals 3-2 in OT in the championship game.
1980–81 Lost to Oshawa Generals 3 games to 2 in division quarter-finals.
1981–82 Defeated Kingston Canadians 6 points to 2 in first round. Lost to Oshawa Generals 8 points to 2 in quarter-finals.
1982–83 Earned first round bye. 2nd place in Leyden. Lost to Oshawa Generals 8 points to 0 in quarter-finals.
1983–84 Defeated Cornwall Royals 6 points to 0 in first round. Lost to Toronto Marlboros 8 points to 2 in quarter-finals.
1984–85 Defeated Ottawa 67's 9 points to 1 in first round. Earned bye through quarter-finals. 1st place in Leyden. Defeated Belleville Bulls 9 points to 1 in semi-finals. Lost to S.S.Marie Greyhounds 9 points to 5 in finals.
1985–86 Defeated Toronto Marlboros 8 points to 0 in first round. Finished tired for first in round-robin vs. Belleville & Kingston with 4 points. Lost to Belleville Bulls 9 points to 7 in semi-finals.
1986–87 Earned bye through 1st round. 2nd place in Leyden. Defeated Ottawa 67's 4 games to 2 in quarter-finals. Lost to Oshawa Generals 4 games to 2 in semi-finals.
1987–88 Defeated Toronto Marlboros 4 games to 0 in first round. Earned bye through quarter-finals. 1st place in Leyden. Defeated Ottawa 67's 4 games to 0 in semi-finals. Lost to Windsor Compuware Spitfires 4 games to 0 in finals.
1988–89 Defeated Belleville Bulls 4 games to 1 in first round. Earned bye through quarter-finals. 1st place in Leyden. Defeated Cornwall Royals 4 games to 2 in semi-finals. Defeated Niagara Falls Thunder 4 games to 2 in finals. OHL CHAMPIONS Finished Memorial Cup round-robin in third place. Lost to Swift Current Broncos 6-2 in the semi-final game.
1989–90 Defeated Ottawa 67's 4 games to 0 in first round. Defeated Belleville Bulls 4 games to 0 in quarter-finals. Lost to Oshawa Generals 4 games to 0 in semi-finals.
1990–91 Lost to North Bay Centennials 4 games to 0 in first round.
1991–92 Earned bye through first round. 1st place in Leyden. Defeated Ottawa 67's 4 games to 1 in quarter-finals. Lost to North Bay Centennials 4 games to 1 in semi-finals.
1992–93 Lost to S.S.Marie Greyhounds 4 games to 0 in super-series. Earned first round bye. Defeated Sudbury Wolves 4 games to 3 in quarter-finals. Defeated Kingston Frontenacs 4 games to 1 in semi-finals. Defeated S.S.Marie Greyhounds 4 games to 1 in finals. OHL CHAMPIONS Finished Memorial Cup round-robin in second place. Defeated Laval Titan 3-1 in the semi-final game. Lost to S.S.Marie Greyhounds 4-2 in the championship game.
1993–94 Lost to Ottawa 67's 4 games to 3 in division quarter-finals.
1994–95 Defeated Oshawa Generals 4 games to 3 in division quarter-finals. Lost to Detroit Jr. Red Wings 4 games to 0 in quarter-finals.
1995–96 Defeated Kingston Frontenacs 4 games to 1 in division quarter-finals. Defeated Sarnia Sting 4 games to 2 in quarter-finals. Defeated Detroit Jr. Red Wings 4 games to 1 in semi-finals. Defeated Guelph Storm 4 games to 3 in finals. OHL CHAMPIONS Finished Memorial Cup round-robin in third place. Defeated Brandon Wheat Kings 4-3 in the semi-final game. Lost to Granby Prédateurs 4-0 in the championship game.
1996–97 Defeated Kingston Frontenacs 4 games to 1 in division quarter-finals. Lost to Oshawa Generals 4 games to 2 in quarter-finals.
1997–98 Lost to Belleville Bulls 4 games to 0 in division quarter-finals.
1998–99 Lost to Oshawa Generals 4 games to 1 in conference quarter-finals.
1999–2000 Lost to Belleville Bulls 4 games to 1 in conference quarter-finals.
2000–01 Lost to St. Michael's Majors 4 games to 3 in conference quarter-finals.
2001–02 Lost to Ottawa 67's 4 games to 2 in conference quarter-finals.
2002–03 Lost to Oshawa Generals 4 games to 3 in conference quarter-finals.
2003–04 Out of playoffs.
2004–05 Defeated Belleville Bulls 4 games to 1 in conference quarter-finals.  Defeated St. Michael's Majors 4 games to 1 in conference semi-finals. Lost to Ottawa 67's 4 games to 0 in conference finals.
2005–06 Defeated Ottawa 67's 4 games to 2 in conference quarter-finals. Defeated Sudbury Wolves 4 games to 0 in conference semi-finals. Defeated Barrie Colts 4 games to 1 in conference finals. Defeated London Knights 4 games to 0 in finals. OHL CHAMPIONS Finished Memorial Cup round-robin tied for third place. Lost to Vancouver Giants 6-0 in tie-breaker game.
2006–07 Out of playoffs.
2007–08 Lost to Belleville Bulls 4 games to 1 in conference quarter-finals.
2008–09 Lost to Brampton Battalion 4 games to 0 in conference quarter-finals.
2009-10 Lost to Mississauga Majors 4 games to 0 in conference quarter-finals.
2010-11 Out of playoffs.
2011-12 Out of playoffs.
2012-13 Out of playoffs.
2013–14 Defeated Kingston Frontenacs 4 games to 3 in conference quarter-finals.  Lost to Oshawa Generals 4 games to 0 in conference semi-finals.
2014-15 Lost to Oshawa Generals 4 games to 1 in conference quarter-finals.
2015-16 Lost to North Bay Battalion 4 games to 3 in conference quarter-finals.
2016–17 Defeated Niagara IceDogs 4 games to 0 in conference quarter-finals.  Defeated Kingston Frontenacs 4 games to 0 in conference semi-finals. Lost to Mississauga Steelheads 4 games to 0 in conference finals.
2017-18 Out of playoffs.
2018-19 Lost to Oshawa Generals 4 games to 1 in conference quarter-finals.
2019-20 Cancelled.
2020-21 Cancelled.
2021-22 Lost to Hamilton Bulldogs 4 games to 0 in conference quarter-finals.

Uniforms and logos
From 1956 to 1974, the Petes wore the red, white & blue colours of the Montreal Canadiens. In 1974–75, the club changed to the maroon & white colours they wear today. In January 2000, a new '3rd' jersey was introduced, that used the maroon background, with white, black & gold trim.

For the 2005–06 season, the Petes unveiled a 50th anniversary jersey that has a black background with maroon & gold trim. During January in the 2006–07 season, the Petes wore throwback jerseys for the TPT Petes.

Arena

The Peterborough Memorial Centre was constructed in 1956, and named in honour of the many war veterans who came from the region. It was built at the east of the fairground and horse track at the corner of Landsdowne and George streets.

The original design included a large stage at the south end of the arena, with an oversized portrait of Queen Elizabeth II above. The seats were all wooden and painted yellow, green and mauve. The Memorial Centre hosted the Memorial Cup tournament in 1996. The arena has a capacity of 4,329 for hockey, and an additional 1,000 for concerts.

In 2003, the Memorial Centre was renovated adding 24 luxury box suites, improved concessions, a licensed restaurant, new seats, boards, scoreboard and the addition of air conditioning. The renovated arena hosted the 2004 OHL All-Star Classic.

Canadian Football Hall of Fame inductee John Badham briefly served as the public address announcer for Peterborough Petes home games.

Broadcasting
The games can be heard on local radio station Extra 90.5 or watched on YourTV channel 700HD 10SD. Petes games can be watched on YourTV with Pete Dalliday (play by play), Scott Arnold (analyst) and Dan Malta (host).

See also
List of ice hockey teams in Ontario

References

External links
www.gopetesgo.com Official web site
Ontario Hockey League  Official web site
Canadian Hockey League Official web site

Ontario Hockey League teams
Ice hockey clubs established in 1956
Petes, Peterborough
1956 establishments in Ontario